Y is the twenty-fifth letter of the Latin alphabet.

Y or y may also refer to:

Places
 Y, Alaska, US
 Y, Somme, France
 Y (river), a river in northern Russia
 Postal code Y indicating Yukon (see List of Y postal codes of Canada)

Art, entertainment, and media

Comics
 Y: The Last Man, a DC comics series by Brian K. Vaughan

Film and television
 Y (2017 film), a Malayalam film directed by Sunil Ibrahim
 Y (2022 film), an Indian Marathi-language thriller film
 Y, the production code for the 1966 Doctor Who serial The Celestial Toymaker
 Y?, An educational children's science program shown on the Nine Network in Australia
 Y: The Last Man (TV series), an American drama based on the comic book series Y: The Last Man

Games
 Y (game), a board game played on a triangular board
 Pokémon Y, a video game for the Nintendo 3DS

Literature
Y (novel), a 2012 novel by Marjorie Celona
 "Y", a poem by Patti Smith from her book Early Work (1994)
 "Y" Is for Yesterday, the twenty-fifth and final novel in Sue Grafton's "Alphabet mystery" series, published in 2017

Music

Albums
 Y (EP), a single album by MBLAQ
 Y (The Pop Group album), an album by The Pop Group
 Y. (Bebe album), an album by Spanish singer Bebe
 Y, a  repackaged edition of I, by Jaejoong
 01011001 (binary number for 'Y' in ASCII), an album by Dutch progressive metal project Ayreon

Songs
 "y", a 2010 song by iamamiwhoami from the album bounty
 "Y..." a track on Belanova's Cocktail
"Y", a 1961 song composed by Mario de Jesús Báez which has been covered by several artists including Luis Miguel on the album Vivo (2000)
"Y", a 2021 song by Citizen Queen

Economics and finance
¥, the symbol for Japanese yen
 Y, the symbol for income

Enterprises and brands
 Alleghany Corporation, NYSE ticker symbol Y
 Brigham Young University, commonly known throughout the Mormon Corridor as "the Y" (as its rival, the University of Utah, is known as "the U")
 Y Combinator (company), American seed brand
 Y-Front a trademark for briefs by Jockey International, used in Britain as a synonym of briefs
 YM-YWHA, aka "the Y"
 YMCA, aka "the Y"
 YWCA, aka "the Y"

Language
 Y (Cyrillic)
 y (IPA), the IPA letter for a close front rounded vowel

Mathematics
 Y combinator, a fixed-point combinator in combinatory logic
 Y, the Bessel function
 Y, dependent variable
 Y or y, vertical axis in the Cartesian coordinate system

Science
 Y, admittance, the inverse of electrical impedance Z
 Haplogroup Y (mtDNA)
 Hyperon
 Luminance (video), in many video color models, such as YIQ and YUV
 Tyrosine, abbreviated Y or Tyr
 Y boson
 Y chromosome
 y, year, a non-SI abbreviation for this unit of time
 Yellow, in the CMYK color model
 y, yocto-, the SI prefix for 10−24
 Y, yotta-, the SI prefix for 1024
 Yttrium, symbol Y, a chemical element
 Y, a hypothetical stellar class of ultra-cool dwarf stars

Transportation and travel
 Y (New York City Subway service), an unused New York City Subway service label
 Basque Y, a Spanish high-speed rail network so called for its Y shape
 Y, code for economy class
 Yaesu Route of Shuto Expressway in Tokyo, Japan, numbered as Route Y

Other uses
Ⓨ, a typographical symbol in Japanese resale price maintenance
 Generation Y
 Y-shape, the shape that resembles the letter Y
 Y-stations, World War 2 listening stations
 Yankee, the military time zone code for UTC−12:00

See also
 The Y (disambiguation)
 Model Y (disambiguation)
 Y class (disambiguation)
 Why (disambiguation)
 Wye (disambiguation)